Verkhnodniprovsk (or Verkhnyodniprovsk,) is a city in Kamianske Raion, Dnipropetrovsk Oblast (province) of Ukraine. The city is located at confluence of the Samotkan into the Kamianske Reservoir at the Dnieper. Verkhnodniprovsk hosts the administration of Verkhnodniprovsk urban hromada, one of the hromadas of Ukraine. Population: In 2001, the population was 16,976.

Until 18 July 2020, Verkhnodniprovsk was the administrative center of Verkhnodniprovsk Raion. The raion was abolished in July 2020 as part of the administrative reform of Ukraine, which reduced the number of raions of Dnipropetrovsk Oblast to seven.The area of Verkhnodniprovsk Raion was merged into Kamianske Raion.

Transport

Famous people
Verkhnodniprovsk was the birthplace of politician Volodymyr Shcherbytsky, who served as the First Secretary of the Communist Party of Ukraine from 1972 to 1989.

Gallery

References

External links

 
 

Cities in Dnipropetrovsk Oblast
Verkhnedneprovsky Uyezd
Cities of district significance in Ukraine
Populated places established in the Russian Empire
Populated places on the Dnieper in Ukraine